Olga Neuwirth (born 4 August 1968 in Graz) is an Austrian contemporary classical composer, visual artist and author. She gained fame mainly through her operas and music theater works, which often deal with topical and decidedly political themes of identity, violence and intolerance.

Life and Work 
Neuwirth was born in Graz, the daughter of Griseldis Neuwirth and pianist Harald Neuwirth. She is the niece of Gösta Neuwirth and the sister of sculptor Flora Neuwirth.

As a child at the age of seven, Neuwirth began lessons on the trumpet but was forced to abandon her original plans to study trumpet after an accident that left her with a jaw injury. As a high school student, Neuwirth took part in composition workshops with Hans Werner Henze and Gerd Kühr. At the age of 16, she met writer Elfriede Jelinek, the winner of the Nobel Prize for Literature, and the two artists have since enjoyed an artistically "fruitful collaboration". The then-17-year-old composer named her first commissioned composition Die gelbe Kuh tanzt Ragtime. The work was composed for the opening of the  festival in 1985. 

Neuwirth first studied composition with Elinor Armer at the San Francisco Conservatory of Music, beginning in 1986. She also studied painting and film at San Francisco’s Art College. She continued her studies at the University of Music and Performing Arts Vienna under Erich Urbanner, while studying at the Institute for Composition and Electroacoustics. Her master's thesis was written on the music in Alain Resnais's film L'Amour à mort, entitled "On the use of film music in L'amour à mort by Alain Resnais." In 1985/86, she studied music and art at the San Francisco Conservatory of Music with Elinor Armer. She studied painting and film at the San Francisco Art College. In 1993/94 she studied with Tristan Murail and worked at IRCAM, producing such works as "...?risonanze!..." for viola d'amore. She received significant inspiration in this period from her encounters with Adriana Hölszky (Nicht beirren lassen! Weitermachen!) and the Italian composer  Luigi Nono. Neuwirth had the chance to meet with Luigi Nono, who had similarly radical politics, and has claimed this had a strong influence on her life.

She has numerous chamber music works released on the Kairos label, and has collaborated with Elfriede Jelinek on the opera "Bählamms Fest." Neuwirth's opera of David Lynch's film Lost Highway incorporates both live and pre-recorded audio and visual feeds, alongside other electronics. The world premiere took place in Graz in 2003, performed by the Klangforum Wien with the electronics realized at the Institut für Elektronische Musik (IEM). The American premiere of the opera took place at Oberlin College in Oberlin, Ohio, and featured further performances at Columbia University's Miller Theatre in New York City, produced by Oberlin Conservatory and the Oberlin Contemporary Music Ensemble. The surround-sound recording released by Kairos was awarded the Diapason d'Or. The UK premiere took place at the Young Vic in London in April 2008, in a co-production with the English National Opera, directed by Diane Paulus and conducted by Baldur Brönnimann.

Neuwirth’s original compositional style is characterized by the use of diverse compositional techniques and hybrid sound materials, with a constant questioning of artistic and socio-political norms. She refers to an “art in-between.” Stefan Drees remarks: “The catastrophic, the plunge into unfamiliar regions with all the attendant consequences, is therefore a fundamental mood of her compositions, winding like a red thread through her works.” Usually assigned to the category of so-called contemporary classical music, her works since the late 1980s have sought to transcend the genre restrictions imposed by the music business. From a multitude of “sources of inspiration...from art, architecture, literature and music, intellectual history, psychology, natural science, and everyday reality [...]." Neuwirth creates an art from that is as multidimensional as it is distinct. For example, in Le Encantadas o le avventure nel mare delle meraviglie (2014), Neuwirth's preoccupation with Herman Melville's novella The Encantadas (1894), as well as inspirations from the sound world of Luigi Nono – here especially from his influential work Prometeo (1984) – coalesce into a “fictional adventure novel through multiple spatial sound effects.” The starting point of this composition is an acoustical survey (Neuwirth: “preservation of acoustic heritage”) of the Chiesa San Lorenzo in Venice.

Neuwirth has created several full-length music theatre works, including the video opera Lost Highway (2003), based on David Lynch’s film; Bählamms Fest (1993/1997), drawing on the work of Leonora Carrington; The Outcast, referencing Herman Melville; and American Lulu, inspired by Alban Berg. Neuwirth's opera Orlando, based on the novel by Virginia Woolf, is the first full-length opera composed by a woman and commissioned by the Vienna State Opera to be performed in Vienna. The world premiere took place on 8 December 2019. It was later selected as the world premiere of the year in an international critics' poll conducted by the trade journal Opernwelt.

Interested in a broad spectrum of stimuli and possibilities of expression, Neuwirth was already crossing genre boundaries between theatrical drama, opera, radio drama, performance art and video in the 1990s. This was reflected in the titles of her works, for example in The Outcast – a musicstallation-theater. Neuwirth often set herself the goal of breaking up established forms of concert presentation in order to arrive at a “fluid form”. For example, during the breaks in her two “portrait concerts” at the 1998 Salzburg Festival, the sound of wind-up toy instruments on a reinforced metal plate was transmitted into the concert hall’s auditorium by means of several loudspeakers, with visuals projected live onto a screen, creating an immersive listening experience. In addition, “prompt texts” for the audience’s behavior, written by Jelinek, were inserted into the work. Neuwirth’s works contain an explicit expansion of the artistic effect from the concert hall into public spaces, for example in Talking Houses (1996), a sound installation for shops along the main square of Deutschlandsberg, Austria (created jointly with Hans Hoffer), and in the sound installation ...le temps désechanté ... ou dialogue aux enfers (2005) at the Place Igor Stravinsky in Paris. For this latter work, commissioned in 2005 by IRCAM Paris, a motion-capture camera was used to allow electroacoustic sounds to interact with the streams of people moving through the square. As the number of passers-by rose, a musical transformation was set in motion. However, the Paris police ultimately ordered the sound installation to be shut down.

The composer's preoccupation with the intersections between music and visual art culminated in 2007 with her participation in the documenta 12 contemporary art exhibition, for which she produced a sound/film installation. In addition, she has continually expanded the field of her activities by writing texts and film scripts, and producing short films, performances and photo series.

Olga Neuwirth has also composed a number of film scores, including music for the silent films Symphonie diagonale (1924), Maudite soit la Guerre (1914) and City Without Jews (1924), as well as soundtracks to films by Kurt Mayer and Josef Dabernig. The composer also wrote music for the feature films Das Vaterspiel by director Michael Glawogger, which was screened at the Berlinale film festival in 2009, and Ich seh, Ich seh by directors Veronika Franz and Severin Fiala, which premiered in 2014 at the Venice International Film Festival. She additionally collaborated with French installation, video and conceptual artist Dominique Gonzales-Foerster on the multimedia installation ...ce qui arrive.…

Neuwirth has long reflected on the everyday life of professional composers, and especially of female composers, groups that are rather marginalized within contemporary art circles. She has clearly conveyed her thoughts on this issue in a number of texts. She frequently expresses herself on political issues, calling for vigilance in the face of social and political changes (for example, with a speech in front of the Vienna State Opera at a mass protest held on 19 September 2000, entitled “I will not be yodeled out of existence”).

Collaborations 
Olga Neuwirth has received commissions from international institutions including Carnegie Hall, the Lucerne Festival, the Salzburg Festival, the Elbphilharmonie Hamburg, the Vienna State Opera and many others. She was composer in residence at the Salzburg Festival in 1999, the Koninklijk Filharmonisch Orkest van Vlaanderen in Antwerp in 2000, the Lucerne Festival in both 2002 and 2016, the Festival d'Automne in 2011, and the Elbphilharmonie Hamburg and the Wiener Konzerthaus in 2019. Her works have been performed by the conductors Pierre Boulez, Peter Eötvös, Daniel Harding, Matthias Pintscher, Valerij Gergjev, Susanna Mälkki, François-Xavier Roth and Alan Gilbert, among others. Leading orchestras and ensembles have included Neuwirth's compositions in their programs, including the Vienna Philharmonic, the Berliner Philharmoniker, the New York Philharmonic Orchestra, the Scottish Symphony Orchestra, the Deutsches Symphonie-Orchester Berlin, the BBC Symphony Orchestra, the London Symphony Orchestra, the Orchestre Philharmonique de Radio France, the NDR Symphony Orchestra, the Bavarian Radio Symphony Orchestra, the ORF Radio Symphony Orchestra, Ensemble Intercontemporain, the Ensemble Modern, the ICE Ensemble, the Talea Ensemble, Klangforum Wien, the London Sinfonietta, Ensemble Musikfabrik, the Phace Ensemble and the Arditti Quartet. Numerous soloists, including Hakan Hardenberger, Antoine Tamestit, Thomas Larcher, Jochen Kowalski, Robyn Schulkowsky, Marino Formenti, Claire Chase and Andrew Watts have participated in performances of Neuwirth's works.

Neuwirth also frequently collaborates with artists from other artistic genres, such as architect Peter Zumthor (Bregenz 2017), the New York architects of Asymptote Architecture (ZKM 2017), and the computer music and audio/acoustics research artist Markus Noisternig. The composer also worked with video artist Tal Rosner to create the interactive installation Disenchanted Island at Centre Pompidou in Paris (2016).

Neuwirth is a member of the Bavarian Academy of Fine Arts, the Academy of Arts (Berlin) and the Royal Swedish Academy of Music.

She has served as a professor at the University of Music and Performing Arts in Vienna since 2021.

Awards 
 1997: Erste-Bank-Kompositionspreis
 1999: Hindemith Prize, Ernst von Siemens Composers' Prize
 2000: Ernst-Krenek-Preis for the opera Bählamms Fest.
 2008: Heidelberger Künstlerinnenpreis (Heidelberg Prize for Female Artists).
 2009: South Bank Show Award for Lost Highway
 2010: Großer Österreichischer Staatspreis
 2010: Louis Spohr Musikpreis Braunschweig
 2011: Nominated for the Österreichischer Filmpreis (film score to Das Vaterspiel)
 2014: Nominated for the Österreichischer Filmpreis (film score to Ich seh Ich seh) 
 2017: Deutscher Musikautorenpreis (category "Komposition Orchester")
 2019: Prize of the Christoph and Stephan Kaske Foundation
 2019: Österreichisches Ehrenzeichen für Wissenschaft und Kunst
 2020: Robert Schumann Prize for Poetry and Music
 2021: Wolf Prize in Arts Laureate in Music 2021
 2021: Opus Klassik: composer of the year
 2022: Grawemeyer Award for Music Composition for her opera Orlando
 2022: Ernst von Siemens Music Prize

Works 
Neuwirth's works were published mainly by Ricordi and Boosey & Hawkes:

Stage works 
 Körperliche Veränderungen and Der Wald (1989/1990). Two operas after Elfriede Jelinek
Bählamms Fest (1997/98) Music theatre in thirteen pictures. Text: Elfriede Jelinek after Leonora Carrington
 Lost Highway (2002–2003) An opera adaptation of the 1997 David Lynch film of the same name
 American Lulu (2006–2011) New interpretation of Alban Berg’s opera Lulu by Olga Neuwirth
 The Outcast – Homage to Herman Melville (2009–2011), a "musicstallation theatre" with video, libretto by Barry Gifford and Olga Neuwirth with monologues for Old Melville by Anna Mitgutsch
 Kloing! and A songplay in 9 fits, Hommage à Klaus Nomi (2011), a music-theatre evening produced and compiled by Olga Neuwirth
 Orlando (2019) – an opera based on the novel by Virginia Woolf, commissioned by Wiener Staatsoper

Concertos (for solo instruments and full orchestra) 

 Sans soleil (1994) for two Ondes Martenot, orchestra and live-electronics
 Photophorus (1997) for two E-Guitars and orchestra
 locus...doublure...solus (2001) for piano and orchestra (version for orchestra)
 Zefiro aleggia...nell´infinito... (2004) for bassoon and orchestra
 … miramondo multiplo … (2006) for trumpet and orchestra
 Remnants of songs...an Amphigory (2009) for viola and orchestra
 Trurliade – Zone Zero (2016) for percussion and orchestra

Orchestra works 
 Clinamen / Nodus (1999)
 anaptyxis (2000)
 Masaot/Clocks without Hands (2013)
Keyframes for a Hippogriff − Musical Calligrams in memoriam Hester Diamond (2019) for orchestra, countertenor and boys´ choir

Ensemble works 
 Elfi und Andi (1997) for speaker, e-guitar, double bass, bass clarinet, saxophone and two playback-CD’s (voice from tape: Marianne Hoppe). With texts by Elfriede Jelinek
 The Long Rain A video opera with surround-screens (1999/2000) for 4 soloists, 4 ensemble groups, live-electronic, after a story by Ray Bradbury
 Construction in space (2000) for 4 soloists, 4 ensemble groups and live-electronic
 Hommage à Klaus Nomi (2009) Chamber orchestra version
 Ishmaela's White World (2012)
Eleanor (2014/2015) for a female blues singer, drum-kit-player, ensemble and samples
Aello – ballet mécanomorphe (2016/2017) for flute, 2 trumpest, strings, synthesizer and typewriter

Chamber music 
 Akroate Hadal (1995) for string quartet
 Ondate II (1998) for two bass clarinets
Hommage à Klaus Nomi (1998) Songs for countertenor and small ensemble
 voluta / sospeso (1999) for basset horn, clarinet, violin, violoncello, percussion and piano
 ...ad auras... in memoriam H. (1999) 
 settori (1999) for string quartet
Zwei Räthsel von W.A.M. (1999) Text: W. A. Mozart, Leopold Mozart; for coloraturo soprano, alto, viola, cello, 6 Zimbel, tape and live-electronic
... ce qui arrive ... (with a interactive live video by Dominique Gonzales-Foerster) (2003/2004) for 2 groups, samples and live-electronic after Paul Auster
 In Nacht und Eis (2006) for bassoon, cello with ringmodulator
 Kloing! (2007) for piano (computer-aided CEUS-piano) and a interactive live video
 Hommage à Klaus Nomi (version for chamber orchestra) (2009)
 in the realms of the unreal (2009) for string quartet
 Quasare / Pulsare II (2017) for violin, cello and piano
 CoronAtion Cycle (2020) CoronAtion IV/Version I – a 9-hours-long live sound installation for Robyn Schulkowsky and Joey Baron

Solo works 
 Marsyas (2003–2004, revised 2006) for piano
Trurl-Tichy-Tinkle (2016) for piano

References

Further reading
 
Bettina Flitner: Frauen mit Visionen – 48 Europäerinnen. Mit Texten von Alice Schwarzer. Knesebeck, München 2004, pp. 154–157.
 Stefan Drees (ed.): Olga Neuwirth. Zwischen den Stühlen. A Twilight Song auf der Suche nach dem verlorenen Klang, Anton Pustet, Salzburg 2008, .
 Olga Neuwirth: Bählamms Fest: Ein venezianisches Arbeitsjournal 1997–1999, Droschl Verlag, Graz 2003, .

External links 
 
 
 
List of works at Klassika.info
Biography, work descriptions and detailed information at boosey.com

20th-century classical composers
20th-century Austrian composers
21st-century classical composers
Austrian classical composers
Women classical composers
University of Music and Performing Arts Vienna alumni
Members of the Academy of Arts, Berlin
Composers from Graz
1968 births
Living people
Ernst von Siemens Composers' Prize winners
20th-century women composers
21st-century women composers